Mirat-ul-Akhbar was a Persian-language journal founded and edited by Raja Rammohan Roy. The newspaper was first published on 12 April 1822. It was published on a weekly basis on Fridays. British journalist James Silk Buckingham was also closely involved in the operation of the newspaper. The Mirat-ul-Akhbar was not well-received by the colonial government, and was termed to be theologically controversial by official W.B. Bayley. On April 4, 1823, the colonial government passed a Press Ordinance that introduced regulations against the Indian press, namely the requirement of a license to publish journals. In protest, Roy closed the Mirat-ul-Akhbar on the same day. The journal's final issue listed his criticisms of the Ordinance.

See also 
Raja Rammohan Roy
Jam-i-Jahan-Numa

References

Defunct newspapers published in India
Defunct weekly newspapers
Persian-language newspapers
Publications established in 1822
Publications disestablished in 1823
1822 establishments in India